Svendsen Glacier is a meandering glacier, 13 nautical miles (24 km) long, in the Usarp Mountains. It flows northeastward from Mount Marzolf and emerges between McCain Bluff and Lenfant Bluff onto an ice piedmont just west of the terminus of Rennick Glacier. Mapped by United States Geological Survey (USGS) from surveys and U.S. Navy air photos, 1960–62. Named by Advisory Committee on Antarctic Names (US-ACAN) for Kendall L. Svendsen, United States Antarctic Research Program (USARP) geomagnetist at McMurdo Station, 1967–68.

Glaciers of Pennell Coast